The Communauté de communes des Trois Rivières (CC3R) (before January 2017: Communauté de communes du Pays des Trois Rivières) is a federation of municipalities (communauté de communes) in the Aisne département and in the Hauts-de-France region of France. Since June 2016, its seat is in Buire. Its area is 349.2 km2, and its population was 21,171 in 2018, of which 8,800 in Hirson, the most populous commune.

Composition 

The Communauté de communes des Trois Rivières includes 26 communes:

Demographics

Organization

Administrative seat 
The administrative seat of the communauté de communes was originally located in Saint-Michel. On 3 June 2016, the seat was moved to Buire as the result of an administrative order.

Elected members 
The CC3R is administered by a conseil communautaire, composed of 60 members from 2014 to 2020 and 52 members since the 2020 municipal election. The number of council seats each commune receives is proportional based upon their population as follows:

 18 delegates for Hirson.
 7 delegates for Saint-Michel.
 3 delegates for Origny-en-Thiérache.
 2 delegates for Mondrepuis.
 1 delegate for each remaining 22 communes.

President 

Additionally the president of the CC3R is assisted by 7 vice-presidents, each with their own portfolios and a bureau de l'intercommunalité composed of 6 additional members.

See also
Communes of the Aisne department

References

Thiérache
Intercommunalities of Aisne
Commune communities in France